Kiribatkumbura is a suburb of the city of Kandy, Sri Lanka.

There is a highway museum located in the starting point of Kiribatkumbura from Colombo. The museum has British-era machinery and tools that were used for road construction.

See also
List of towns in Central Province, Sri Lanka

References

External links

Populated places in Kandy District